is a Japanese professional footballer who currently plays for Gainare Tottori.

Club statistics
Updated to 23 February 2018.

References

External links

Profile at Mito HollyHock
Profile at Azul Claro Numazu

1987 births
Living people
Kansai University alumni
Association football people from Tottori Prefecture
Japanese footballers
Japanese expatriate footballers
Regionalliga players
J3 League players
Singapore Premier League players
Mito HollyHock players
Alemannia Aachen players
Azul Claro Numazu players
Albirex Niigata Singapore FC players
Gainare Tottori players
Association football goalkeepers
Japanese expatriate sportspeople in Singapore
Japanese expatriate sportspeople in Germany
Expatriate footballers in Singapore
Expatriate footballers in Germany